Ted Bundy: American Boogeyman is a 2021 American crime film written and directed by Daniel Farrands. The film stars Chad Michael Murray as serial killer Ted Bundy.

Plot
The film concerns the murders committed by Ted Bundy in the 1970s and the subsequent manhunt to apprehend him, led by FBI agents Kathleen McChesney and Robert Ressler.

Cast
 Chad Michael Murray as Ted Bundy
 Holland Roden as Kathleen McChesney
 Lin Shaye as Mrs. Bundy
 Jake Hays as Robert Ressler
 Olivia DeLaurentis as Carol DaRonch
 Diane Franklin as Mrs. Healy
 Marietta Melrose as Karen Chandler
 Greer Grammer as Cheryl Lynch

Release
The film was theatrically released as a one-night showing by Fathom Events.

Redbox released the film on DVD on September 3, 2021.

Reception
Much like Farrands' previous directorial efforts, Ted Bundy: American Boogeyman was panned by critics. On the review aggregator website Rotten Tomatoes, Ted Bundy: American Boogeyman holds a rating of 0%, based on 9 reviews, with an average rating of 3/10.

See also
Aileen Wuornos: American Boogeywoman

References

External links

2020s English-language films
2020s American films
2020s serial killer films
2021 films
2021 thriller films
American biographical drama films
American crime drama films
American serial killer films
Biographical films about serial killers
Crime films based on actual events
Films directed by Daniel Farrands
Films about Ted Bundy
Cultural depictions of Ted Bundy
Films set in the 1970s